Joel Gardner is a Canadian retired ice hockey center who was an All-American for Colgate.

Career
Gardner was recruited to Colgate University by assistant coach Brian Durocher and felt as home as soon as he walked on campus. He quickly became one of the top scorers for the Raiders but it was during his senior year that Gardner enshrined himself in Colgate lore. With stellar goaltending from Dave Gagnon, Gardner led the team in scoring and got the Raiders their first ever ECAC regular season title. Colgate then marched through the ECAC Tournament to capture their first conference championship. Colgate won three close games in the NCAA Tournament, producing their first 30-win season, and reached the program's first championship game. In the final game the team was blinded by the spotlight, according to head coach Terry Slater, and the Raiders made several mistakes that led to goals by Wisconsin. Gardner did his best, scoring a goal and an assist in the match, but the Badgers were too much and skated away with a 7–3 win.

After graduating Colgate University with a BA degree, Gardner began a long professional career which started with the Pittsburgh Penguins (NHL) in 1990. Originally drafted by the Boston Bruins in 1986, Gardner became a free agent in 1990 and signed a 3-year contract and played within the Penguin's organization in the IHL and ECHL Leagues. Gardner plied his trade in Europe for most of the next four years. After returning home to North America in 1998 Gardner again started playing in the minor professional leagues for three years before retiring. After retiring as a professional player Gardner restarted his career in senior hockey, playing for the Petrolia Squires for parts of 6 seasons before hanging up his skates for good.

Gardner was inducted into the Colgate Hall of Honor in 2017.

Statistics

Regular season and playoffs

Awards and honors

References

External links

1967 births
Living people
Ice hockey people from Ontario
Canadian ice hockey centres
Colgate Raiders men's ice hockey players
AHCA Division I men's ice hockey All-Americans
Muskegon Lumberjacks players
Detroit Falcons (CoHL) players
Knoxville Cherokees players
Raleigh IceCaps players
Chatham Wheels players
ERC Selb players
SC Herisau players
Port Huron Border Cats players
Saginaw Gears (UHL) players
Madison Monsters players
Mohawk Valley Prowlers players
Muskegon Fury players